Thomas Arthur Southwell, 2nd Viscount Southwell (16 April 1742 – 14 February 1796), styled The Honourable from 1766 until 1780, was an Irish peer and politician.

He was the oldest son of Thomas Southwell, 1st Viscount Southwell and his wife Margaret Hamilton, daughter of Arthur Cecil Hamilton of Castle Hamilton, Killeshandra Co. Cavan. His younger brother was Robert Henry Southwell. Southwell was educated at Trinity College, Dublin. In 1780, he succeeded his father as viscount.

In 1767, Southwell entered the Irish House of Commons for Limerick County, the same constituency his father had represented before, and sat for it until the following year.

Marriage, children, and succession
On 7 November 1774, he married Sophia Maria Josepha Walsh, third daughter of Francis Joseph Walsh, Comte de Serrant, and had by her four sons and four daughters. Southwell died aged 53 and was succeeded in his titles by his oldest son Thomas.

References

1742 births
1796 deaths
Alumni of Trinity College Dublin
Irish MPs 1761–1768
Members of the Parliament of Ireland (pre-1801) for County Limerick constituencies
Viscounts in the Peerage of Ireland
Politicians from County Limerick